Professional Acknowledgment for Continuing Education credits, or PACE credits, are a type of continuing education credit sponsored by the American Society for Clinical Laboratory Science (ASCLS).  PACE credits fulfill continuing education requirements for various state and regional laboratory regulation boards.  Laboratorians may earn PACE credits by attending seminars, completing mail-away courses, or taking CD-ROM or web-based courses.

External links
American Society of Clinical Laboratory Science
ASCLS Educational Programs
ASCLS-sponsored web-based courses
P.A.C.E. providers
Beckman Coulter Diagnostics  Find out about the latest breakthroughs in clinical diagnostics and laboratory operations.
SCIEX, a provider liquid chromatography mass spectrometry instrumentation, offers P.A.C.E.® credits through its in house training classes
Continuing Education Unlimited - Providing Online & Home Study Lab CE Courses
LabCE.com Laboratory Continuing Education
MediaLab, Inc. Online ASCLS P.A.C.E. credits
National Laboratory Training Netword, provided through the CDC
COLA LabUniversity P.A.C.E. credits

Vocational education